Central of Georgia Railway Company Shop Property is the former administration building of the Central of Georgia Railway. The site complex includes several notable structures, including a freight house, a cotton yard with brick gates which it shares with the Central of Georgia Depot and Trainshed, and a brick viaduct leading to a junction with the line along Louisville Road west of Boundary Street and the Savannah and Ogeechee Canal. The tracks were also located next to "The Gray Building," a Greek Revival structure built in 1856, which the C&G moved their headquarters to. This building became known as "The Red Building."

The Central Railroad was acquired by the Southern Railway in 1963, leading to the decline of all CG buildings in Savannah.

The building was listed on the National Register of Historic Places on March 5, 1970. The CG Depot and Trainshed were added to the NRHP and then declared a National Historic Landmark in 1976, and the Central of Georgia Railroad: Savannah Shops and Terminal Facilities were split off from the station onto its own registry in 1978.

Today it is known as Clark Hall (formerly Eichberg Hall), a branch of the Savannah College of Art and Design Museum of Art. The Gray Building was the original museum, which was named Kiah Hall in 1993.

See also
Buildings in Savannah Historic District

References

External links

Central of Georgia Freight Depots in Savannah (RailGeorgia.com)
SCAD Museum of Art (Official Website)

Railway stations on the National Register of Historic Places in Georgia (U.S. state)
Historic American Engineering Record in Georgia (U.S. state)
Railway freight houses on the National Register of Historic Places
Railway stations in the United States opened in 1854
Central of Georgia Railway
Former railway stations in Georgia (U.S. state)
Museums in Savannah, Georgia
Art museums and galleries in Georgia (U.S. state)
History museums in Georgia (U.S. state)
National Register of Historic Places in Savannah, Georgia
Railway buildings and structures on the National Register of Historic Places in Georgia (U.S. state)
1854 establishments in Georgia (U.S. state)
Repurposed railway stations in the United States
Savannah College of Art and Design buildings and structures
Savannah Historic District